"Dead Star" and "In Your World" are songs by English rock band Muse. Written for and included in a live form on their 2002 compilation album Hullabaloo Soundtrack, the songs were released as a double A-side single to promote the album, and as an EP in Japan and France. The single reached number thirteen on the UK Singles Chart.

Music video 

A video for "In Your World" was also produced, included on the double A-side, which consisted of a live performance and was directed by Matt Askem. The video is considerably shorter than the audio-only live album version, with running times of 2:35 and 3:12 respectively. The video for "Dead Star" shows the band practising in a dark basement and was directed by Tim Qualtrough and Tom Kirk. It has a running time of 3:40, again shorter than the audio-only live album version which has a running time of 4:12. It was recorded in Winston Churchill's house in Brighton.

Other usage in the media

The song was used in the British Soap Opera Emmerdale in September 2006, in which character Cain Dingle leaves the village with Sadie King whilst escaping from the police. The song was used multiple times in scenes, including when Cain blows up his car, and drives into the quarry.

Live Performances 
"Dead Star" was only consistently performed in 2001 and 2002, but has made occasional appearances on all of the band's tours since it originally debuted, with the exception of the Simulation Theory World Tour.

"In Your World" has not been performed since 2002.

Track listing

Charts

References

External links
 

Muse (band) songs
2002 singles
2002 EPs
Mushroom Records singles